Neal McAuley (born 1987 in Ballycastle, County Antrim) is an Irish sportsperson.  He plays hurling with his local club Ballycastle and has been a member of the Antrim senior inter-county team since 2007.

Neal McAuley is the father of three children.

References

1989 births
Living people
Antrim inter-county hurlers
Ballycastle McQuillan hurlers